Kansas's 13th Senate district is one of 40 districts in the Kansas Senate. It has been represented by Republican Richard Hilderbrand since his 2017 appointment to replace fellow Republican Jake LaTurner.

Geography
District 13 covers Cherokee County, Crawford County, and parts of Bourbon and Labette Counties in the southeastern corner of the state. Communities in the district include Pittsburg, Fort Scott, Baxter Springs, Columbus, Galena, Frontenac, and Girard.

The district is located entirely within Kansas's 2nd congressional district, and overlaps with the 1st, 2nd, 3rd, 4th, and 7th districts of the Kansas House of Representatives. It borders the states of Missouri and Oklahoma.

Recent election results

2020

2018 special
In 2017, 13th district incumbent Jake LaTurner was appointed Kansas State Treasurer, and Cherokee County Commissioner Richard Hilderbrand was chosen to replace him. Because the next regular election would not be held for another 3 years, Hilderbrand had to run in a special election in 2018 to serve the remainder of the term.

2016

2012

Federal and statewide results in District 13

References

13
Bourbon County, Kansas
Cherokee County, Kansas
Crawford County, Kansas
Labette County, Kansas